The 1978–79 Marquette Warriors men's basketball team represented the Marquette University during the 1978–79 season. The Warriors were led by head coach Hank Raymonds and played their home games in MECCA Arena in Milwaukee, Wisconsin. The Warriors received an at-large bid to the NCAA Tournament where they reached the Sweet Sixteen. Marquette finished the season with a 22–7 record.

Roster

Schedule and results 

|-
!colspan=9 style=| Regular season

|-
!colspan=9 style=| NCAA Tournament

Rankings

Awards and honors 
Bernard Toole – All-American

References 

Marquette
Marquette Golden Eagles men's basketball seasons
Marquette
Marquette
Marquette